The 1990 Illinois Fighting Illini football team was an American football team that represented the University of Illinois at Urbana-Champaign during the 1990 NCAA Division I-A football season. In their third year under head coach John Mackovic, the Illini compiled an 8–4 record, finished in a four-way tie for first place in the Big Ten Conference, were ranked No. 25 in the final AP Poll, and lost to Clemson in the 1991 Hall of Fame Bowl.

The team's offensive leader were quarterback Jason Verduzco with 2,567 passing yards, fullback Howard Griffith with 1,115 rushing yards, and Shawn Wax with 863 receiving yards.

Schedule

Game summaries

Colorado

Iowa

Michigan

Indiana

Northwestern

Clemson (Hall of Fame Bowl)

Roster

Award winners
 Darrick Brownlow - linebacker (1st-team All-America pick by Football News; 1st-team all-Big Ten pick by AP)
 Moe Gardner - defensive lineman (consensus 1st-team All-American; 1st-team all-Big Ten pick by AP)
 Howard Griffith - fullback (2nd-team all-Big Ten pick by AP)
 Doug Higgins - placekicker (2nd-team all-Big Ten pick by AP)
 Henry Jones - defensive back (2nd-team all-Big Ten pick by AP)
 Marlon Primous - defensive back (2nd-team all-Big Ten pick by AP)
 Tim Simpson -offensive guard (2nd-team all-Big Ten pick by AP)
 Shawn Wax - receiver (2nd-team all-Big Ten pick by AP)

References

Illinois
Illinois Fighting Illini football seasons
Illinois Fighting Illini football